Ghost Riders in the Sky is a studio album by country singer Slim Whitman released by United Artists in 1978. The title track was released in the UK in 1979 as a 7-inch single backed with "Carolina Moon".

Track listing

Side 1
"Ghost Riders in the Sky” (Stan Jones) – 3:17
"Carolina Moon" (Benny Davis, Joe Burke) – 2:38
"All Kinds of Everything” (Derry Lindsay, Jack Smith) – 3:00
"Girl of My Dreams" (Sunny Clapp) – 2:48
”Margie” (Benny Davis, Con Conrad, J. Russel Robinson) 2:07
"A Perfect Day" (Carrie Jacobs Bond) – 2:41

Side 2
"Calypso" (John Denver) – 2:46
"You Are My Sunshine” (Jimmie Davis, Charles Mitchell) – 3:02
"Puff the Magic Dragon” (Peter Yarrow, Leonard Lipton) – 3:22
"Tears Stained My Pillow" (Byron Keith Whitman) – 2:25
"When It's Harvest Time Sweet Angeline" (Charley Kisco, Harry Tobias, Neil Morat) – 1:49
"Goodbye Little Darlin' Goodbye" (Gene Autry, Johnny Marvin) – 3:09

Personnel
Harold Bradley – Electric Guitar
Ray Edenton – Rhythm Guitar
Sonny Garrish – Steel Guitar
David Bird – Keyboards
Buddy Harman – Bass
Strings – Lisa Silver, Sam Terranova, Peter "Zeke" Dawson, Krysten Wilkinson, Martha Wiggins and Earl Spielman
Background Vocals – The Nashville Sounds and on "Tears Stained My Pillow" The Jordanaires

Production
Producers: Alan Warner and Scotty Turner
Orchestral Arranger: Earl Spielman
Engineer: Les Ladd
Recorded at Woodland Sound Studios, Nashville

References

Slim Whitman albums
1978 albums
United Artists Records albums